The County of Orléans was an area of early medieval France including the city of Orléans and its countryside. It was governed by a count.

When Hugh Capet became King of France, the county of Orléans became a part of the royal domain. The lands formed part of the appanages granted to various younger sons of Kings of France with the title Duke of Orléans.

Merovingian counts of Orléans
 Willachar, father-in-law of Chramn son of King Chlothar I

Carolingian counts of Orléans
 Adrian (–818)
 Matfrid (818–828, 830–831)
 Odo I (828–830, 831–834)
  (834–c.860)
 Robert I the Strong (c.860–866)
 Hugh the Abbot (866–886)
 Odo II (886–888)
 Robert II (888–923)
 Hugh the Great (923–956)
 Hugh Capet (956–987)

Capetian counts of Orléans
 Philippe of France, elder son and heir of Saint Louis (later Philip III of France)

See also
 Countess of Orléans
 Duke of Orléans
 Orleanist
 Legitimist

Orleans
 
Orleans